Sergey Sergin (born July 19, 1976) is a Kazakhstani sprint canoer who competed in the early 2000s. At the 2000 Summer Olympics in Sydney, he was eliminated in the heats of the K-1 500 m event and the semifinals of the K-1 1000 m event. He was born in Shymkent.

External links
Sports-Reference.com profile

1979 births
People from Shymkent
Canoeists at the 2000 Summer Olympics
Kazakhstani male canoeists
Living people
Olympic canoeists of Kazakhstan
Asian Games medalists in canoeing
Canoeists at the 1998 Asian Games
Canoeists at the 2002 Asian Games
Medalists at the 1998 Asian Games
Medalists at the 2002 Asian Games
Asian Games gold medalists for Kazakhstan
Asian Games silver medalists for Kazakhstan